The 2014 Supersport World Championship was the sixteenth season of the Supersport World Championship—the eighteenth taking into account the two held under the name of Supersport World Series. It was run over 11 rounds, commencing on 23 February at Phillip Island in Australia and ending on 2 November at Losail in Qatar.

The riders' championship title was won for the first time by a Dutch rider, as Michael van der Mark of the Pata Honda World Supersport team won six races, and achieved ten top-two placings en route to the championship. Van der Mark finished 82 points clear of his nearest rival in the championship, MV Agusta Reparto Corse rider Jules Cluzel, who won a trio of races during the season. Third place in the championship went to Florian Marino of the Kawasaki Intermoto Ponyexpres team, who achieved four podiums in 2014. The season's other winners were van der Mark's team-mate Lorenzo Zanetti at Imola and Kenan Sofuoğlu, who won at Motorland Aragón for Mahi Racing Team India, before parting with the team before the end of the season. In the manufacturers' championship, Honda finished 70 points clear of the next best manufacturer, Kawasaki. The Pata Honda World Supersport team won the teams' championship by over 100 points ahead of the Kawasaki Intermoto Ponyexpres team.

Race calendar and results
The Fédération Internationale de Motocyclisme released a 13-round provisional calendar on 29 November 2013. The 12-round updated version of the calendar, issued by the FIM on 12 April 2014, saw the cancellation of the Russian round and the inclusion of Qatar as the venue of the last event of the season.

On 31 July 2014, the Qatar round was confirmed by the Fédération Internationale de Motocyclisme, and was to be held under floodlights for its return to the calendar. On the same date, it was announced that the South African round – due to be held on 19 October at Phakisa Freeway in Welkom – was cancelled due to delays in achieving the FIM homologation requirements. It was later announced that the round would not be replaced on the calendar, reducing the season to 11 rounds.

Entry list

All entries used Pirelli tyres.

Championship standings

Riders' championship

Manufacturers' championship

References

External links

Supersport World Championship seasons
Supersport World Championship
World